Birketveit is the administrative centre of Iveland municipality in Agder county, Norway. The Iveland Church is located on the south end of the village. The small lake Birketveitstjønna lies on the west side of the village. The municipal government building is located here and it houses a small mineral/mining museum. There is also a municipal sports hall in Birketveit.

References

Villages in Agder
Iveland
Setesdal